The 1944 Awarua by-election was a by-election held during the 27th New Zealand Parliament in the Southland electorate of Awarua. The by-election occurred following the death of MP James Hargest and was won by George Herron.

Background
Hargest, who was first elected to represent Awarua in 1935, was killed in action on 12 August 1944. His death instigated the Awarua by-election, which was contested by three candidates.

George Herron, a local official in the Farmers Union, was chosen to contest the seat for the National Party. The Labour Party chose local schoolteacher Leo Sylvester O'Sullivan as their nominee. Previously, Labour had attempted to secure Victoria Cross recipient Jack Hinton to stand as their candidate, who had previously signalled his interest in pursuing a career in politics, however he was unable to be contacted to confirm his candidacy. Robert Henderson, a local pensioner, stood for the Real Democracy Movement who advocated for monetary reform.

Results
The following table gives the election results:

Notes

References

1944 elections in New Zealand
Awarua
Politics of Southland, New Zealand